Caño Island is a small island and biological reserve in the Bahia de Corcovado (Corcovado Bay) in Osa, Costa Rica.

Biological reserve 
Caño Island Biological Reserve, is a protected area in Costa Rica, managed under the Osa Conservation Area, it was created in 1976 by decree 6385-A.

The island and surrounding marine area of  has been established as a biological reserve, with a permanent ranger station on the island. It is a popular tourist destination for ecotourism such as whale watching, attracting visitors for its beaches, coral beds, and sea life. Researchers currently use the coral beds to study the factors surrounding coral death and recolonization. Marine life includes manta rays, dolphins, false killer whales, sea turtles, whales, a wide variety of fish, and possibly manatees as well. The nudibranch Mexichromis tica was described from here and Darwin Island on the Galápagos Islands in 2004. The limited diversity of terrestrial fauna, however, is noticeable, with the island having less than one percent of the insect diversity of the peninsula and an absence of numerous animals native to the nearby mainland.

Archaeology  
Evidence of pre-Columbian human activity on the island is substantial, with some of the most interesting artifacts being stone spheres evidently carved by early civilizations.

See also
 Corcovado National Park
 Bahía Drake
 List of lighthouses in Costa Rica

References

External links
 Photos of Caño Island

Cano, Isla del
Lighthouses in Costa Rica
Nature reserves in Costa Rica
Protected areas established in 1976